The men's 4 x 400 metres relay event at the 2011 All-Africa Games was held on 15 September.

Results

References
Results
Results

Relay